The 2014 The Oaks Club Challenger was a professional tennis tournament played on outdoor clay courts. It was the sixth edition of the tournament and part of the 2014 ITF Women's Circuit, offering a total of $50,000 in prize money. It took place in Osprey, Florida, United States, on March 24–30, 2014.

Singles main draw entrants

Seeds 

 1 Rankings as of March 17, 2014

Other entrants 
The following players received wildcards into the singles main draw:
  Jan Abaza
  Madison Brengle
  Julia Cohen
  Jennifer Elie

The following players received entry from the qualifying draw:
  Ashleigh Barty
  Lucie Hradecká
  Yulia Putintseva
  Olga Savchuk

The following player received entry into the singles main draw as a lucky loser:
  Ilona Kremen

Withdrawals 
Before the tournament
  Mandy Minella (edema in right arm)
  Zhang Shuai (shoulder injury)
  Barbora Záhlavová-Strýcová

Champions

Singles 

  Anna Karolína Schmiedlová def.  Marina Erakovic 6–2, 6–3

Doubles 

  Rika Fujiwara /  Hsieh Shu-ying def.  Irina Falconi /  Eva Hrdinová 6–3, 6–7(5–7), [10–4]

References

External links 
 2014 The Oaks Club Challenger at ITFtennis.com
 

2014 ITF Women's Circuit
2014
2014
2014 in American sports
2014 in sports in Florida
March 2014 sports events in the United States